The Sparkman–Skelley Farm is a property in Boston, Tennessee that was listed on the National Register of Historic Places in 2000.  It has also been known as Sparkman Farm and as Skelley Farm.  It dates from c.1846.

It includes Italianate and Greek Revival architecture.

The NRHP eligibility of the property was covered in a 1988 study of Williamson County historical resources.

References

Buildings and structures in Williamson County, Tennessee
Italianate architecture in Tennessee
Greek Revival houses in Tennessee
Buildings and structures completed in 1846
Farms on the National Register of Historic Places in Tennessee
National Register of Historic Places in Williamson County, Tennessee